Erts is a village in Andorra.

ERTS may refer to:

 Landsat 1, originally named "Earth Resources Technology Satellite 1"
 Electronic Arts ( formerly, now also

 ERT (disambiguation)